Nguyễn Huỳnh Quốc Cường (born 12 July 1982) is a Vietnamese footballer who plays as a goalkeeper for V-League (Vietnam) club Long An.

References 

1982 births
Living people
Vietnamese footballers
Association football goalkeepers
V.League 1 players
Song Lam Nghe An FC players